Denton is a city in and the county seat of Denton County, Texas, United States. With a population of 139,869 as of 2020, it is the 27th-most populous city in Texas, the 197th-most populous city in the United States, and the 12th-most populous city in the Dallas–Fort Worth metroplex.

A Texas land grant led to the formation of Denton County in 1846, and the city was incorporated in 1866. Both were named after pioneer and Texas militia captain John B. Denton. The arrival of a railroad line in the city in 1881 spurred population, and the establishment of the University of North Texas in 1890 and Texas Woman's University in 1901 distinguished the city from neighboring regions. After the construction of Dallas/Fort Worth International Airport finished in 1974, the city had more rapid growth; as of 2011, Denton was the seventh-fastest growing city with a population over 100,000 in the country.

Located on the far north end of the Dallas–Fort Worth metroplex in North Texas on Interstate 35, Denton is known for its active music scene; the North Texas State Fair and Rodeo, Denton Arts and Jazz Festival, and Thin Line Fest attract over 300,000 people to the city each year. The city has hot, humid summers and few extreme weather events. Its diverse citizenry is represented by a nonpartisan city council, and numerous county and state departments have offices in the city. With over 45,000 students enrolled at the two universities within its city limits, Denton is often characterized as a college town. As a result of the universities' growth, educational services play a large role in the city's economy. Residents are served by the Denton County Transportation Authority, which provides commuter rail and bus service to the area.

History

Denton's formation is closely tied to that of Denton County. White settlement of the area began in the mid-1800s when William S. Peters of Kentucky obtained a land grant from the Texas Congress and named it Peters Colony. After initial settlement in the southeast part of the county in 1843, the Texas Legislature voted to form Denton County in 1846. Both the county and the town were named for John B. Denton, a preacher and lawyer who was killed in 1841 during a skirmish with the Kichai people in what is now Tarrant County. Pickneyville and Alton were selected as the county seat before Denton was named the seat in 1857. That year, a commission laid out the city and named the first streets.

On July 8, 1860, approximately half of the downtown Square burned down in what was later called the "Texas Troubles". Fires occurred in ten Texas communities that day, including Dallas and Pilot Point, and were quickly attributed to a slave insurrection. By the end of July, vigilante justice took hold and "[r]egularly constituted law-enforcement agencies stepped aside to allow the vigilantes to do their work. Although no hard evidence was ever adduced to prove the guilt of a single alleged black arsonist or white abolitionist, many unfortunates of both classes were nevertheless hanged for their alleged crimes."

In February 1861, a statewide referendum was held and Texans voted to join the Confederate States of America.

Post–Civil War 
Denton incorporated in 1866; its first mayor was J.B. Sawyer. As the city expanded beyond its original boundaries (which extended half a mile in every direction from center of the public square), it became an agricultural trade center for the mill and cottage industries. The arrival of the Texas and Pacific Railway in 1881 gave Denton its first rail connection and brought an influx of people to the area. North Texas Normal College, now the University of North Texas, was established in 1890, and the Girls' Industrial College, now Texas Woman's University, was founded in 1901. As the universities increased in size, their impact on Denton's economy and culture increased. Electricity came to Denton in 1905 with the creation of Denton Municipal Electric.

Segregation and Jim Crow era 
After the Civil War, "Freedmen Settlements" were started throughout the South. One Freedman Settlement, Quakertown, thrived just south of what is now Texas Woman's University until around 1920, when the city government forcibly removed the residents to make way for a park. Quakertown's Black children were served separately from white children by the Frederick Douglass School. Originally scheduled to open in September 1913, it was mysteriously burned down the night before its scheduled opening. It was rebuilt and in 1949 renamed the "Fred Moore School".

Postwar growth 
Denton's population grew from 26,844 in 1960 to 48,063 in 1980. Its connection to the Dallas–Fort Worth metroplex via I-35E and I-35W played a major role in the growth, and the opening of Dallas/Fort Worth International Airport in 1974 led to a population increase. In the 1980s, heavy manufacturing companies like Victor Equipment Company and Peterbilt joined older manufacturing firms such as Moore Business Forms and Morrison Milling Company in Denton. The population rose from 66,270 in 1990 to 80,537 in 2000. In May 2006, Houston-based real estate company United Equities purchased the 100-block of Fry Street and announced that several of the historic buildings would be demolished and the businesses displaced to accommodate a new mixed-use commercial center. Some residents, who sought to preserve the area as a historic and cultural icon, opposed the proposal. The Denton City Council approved a new proposal for the area from Dinerstein Cos in 2010.

Timeline

 1857
 Seat of Denton County relocated to Denton from Alton
 First Methodist Church founded.
 County Courthouse built.
 1858 – Union Baptist Church founded
 1866 – Town of Denton incorporated
 1868 – Denton Monitor newspaper began publication
 1869 – J.B. Sawyer became mayor.
 1870 – Denton (and Texas) readmitted to the Union after the American Civil War, per Reconstruction Acts
 1880 – Population: 1,194
 1881 – Railroad began operating
 1882
 Denton Chronicle newspaper began publication
 Fire station built
 1890 – North Texas Normal College opened
 1894 – City Hall built
 1896
 Streetcar began operating
 Denton County Courthouse rebuilt.
 1899 – Denton Record and Chronicle newspaper in publication
 1900 – Population: 4,187
 1903 – Girls' Industrial College established
 1907
 Trolley began operating
 Rector Road Bridge built.
 1914 – City of Denton incorporated
 1916 – College's Campus Chat newspaper begins publication
 1920 – City police department and Rotary Club established
 1921 – Denton County League of Women Voters formed
 1923 – Public park created in Quakertown
 1927 – Denton City Hall built
 1930 – Population: 9,587
 1933 – Public library opened
 1939 – KDNT radio began broadcasting
 1941 – Little Chapel in the Woods built
 1947 – Denton Municipal Airport began operating
 1950 – Population: 21,372
 1954 – Federal Civil Defense Administration regional office relocated to Denton from Dallas.
 1959 – Council-manager form of government adopted
 1960 – Denton State School established
 1961 – North Texas State University active
 1966
 Civic Center built
 Denton joined the North Central Texas Council of Governments (approximate date)
 1969 – Denton Community Theatre active
 1974 – Dallas–Fort Worth Regional Airport operating in vicinity of Denton
 1979 – Courthouse-on-the-Square Museum opened
 1980
 Golden Triangle Mall in business
 Population: 48,063.
 1987 – North Texas State University Press headquartered in Denton
 1988 – North Texas State University renamed University of North Texas
 1996 – City website online (approximate date)
 2000 – Population: 80,537
 2003
 Public swimming pool opened
 Michael C. Burgess became U.S. representative for Texas's 26th congressional district
 2010 – Population: 113,383
 2011 – Downtown Denton Transit Center and University of North Texas' Apogee Stadium opened
 2014 – Chris Watts became mayor

 2015 – Friendship City relationship formalized with Santa Rosa de Múzquiz, Mexico.
 2020 – Gerard Hudspeth became Denton's first African-American mayor.

Geography
Denton is on the northern edge of the Dallas–Fort Worth metropolitan area. These three cities form the area known as the "Golden Triangle of North Texas". The city lies in the northeast edge of the Bend Arch–Fort Worth Basin, which is characterized by flat terrain. Part of the city is atop the Barnett Shale, a geological formation believed to contain large quantities of natural gas.

Climate

With its hot, humid summers and cool winters, Denton's climate is characterized as humid subtropical and is within USDA hardiness zone 8a. Denton lies on the southern end of what is commonly referred to as "Tornado Alley"; the National Weather Service occasionally issues tornado watches, but tornadoes rarely form in the city. Flash floods and severe thunderstorms are frequent in the spring.

Demographics

Along with much of the Dallas–Fort Worth metroplex, Denton has grown rapidly since the beginning of the 21st century, becoming the seventh-fastest growing city in the U.S. with a population over 100,000 between 2010 and 2011. The median income for a household was $60,018 in 2020. The per capita income was $29,109. About 15.7% of the population were below the poverty line. Denton fares above the national average with 90.4% of the population high school graduated or higher and 38.9% with a bachelor's degree or higher. According to the 2020 United States census, there were 139,869 people, 47,777 households, and 28,430 families residing in the city. Denton's population made it the 197th largest city in the United States and the 27th largest in Texas per the 2020 census.

The United States Census Bureau defines an urban area of northern Dallas-area suburbs that are separated from the Dallas–Forth Worth urban area, with Denton and Lewisville as the principal cities: the Denton–Lewisville, TX urban area had a population of 429,461 as of the 2020 census, ranked 96th in the United States.

Economy
The educational services, health and social services, manufacturing, and general retail sectors employ over 20,000 people in Denton. The city's three largest educational institutions, including the University of North Texas, Denton Independent School District, and Texas Woman's University, are the largest employers, employing almost 12,000 people. The University of North Texas is the city's largest employer, with 7,764 employees comprising 12.59% of the workforce. The City of Denton also employs more than 1,334 people. Wholesale trade and hospitality jobs also play major roles. Notable businesses headquartered in Denton include truck manufacturer Peterbilt, beauty supplier Sally Beauty Company, and jewelry producer Jostens. Golden Triangle Mall, the city's largest shopping complex with over 90 specialty shops, is a major source of retail trade.

Top employers
According to the city's 2020 Comprehensive Annual Financial Report, the top employers in Denton were:

Arts and cultural life
Denton is home to several annual artistic and cultural events that cater to residents and tourists. The annual North Texas State Fair and Rodeo began in 1928 and promotes Texas's cowboy culture. In addition to a rodeo, the event features several local country rock performances, pageants, and food contests. Hosted by the North Texas State Fairgrounds since 1948, the fair brings in over 150,000 people during its nine-day run.

The Denton Municipal Airport has hosted the annual Denton Airshow since 1998. The event includes aerial demonstrations and airplane exhibits; it attracted over 10,000 attendees in 2012. Other events in the city include an annual Redbud Festival, the Fiesta on the Square, and the Thin Line Fest. Denton houses the largest community garden in the nation, Shiloh Field Community Garden, which covers 14.5 acres.

Music

Denton's independent music scene has emerged alongside its academic music establishments, including the University of North Texas College of Music. The city's live music venues are largely supported by Denton's college-town atmosphere, although show attendance is bolstered by area residents. The Dallas Observer features a column on Denton's music scene. In 2007 and 2008, Denton's music scene received feature attention from The Guardian, Pop Matters, and The New York Times. Paste Magazine named Denton's music scene the best in the nation in 2008. In 2014, the Huffington Post listed Denton as Texas's top emerging cultural hot spot, calling Denton "practically an indie band factory at this point".

The city-sponsored Denton Arts and Jazz Festival attracts over 200,000 people each year for live music, food, crafts, and recreation at Civic Center Park. With hopes to create a live music event like South by Southwest, Denton held the first North by 35 Music Festival, later renamed 35 Denton, in March 2009. The festival ceased in 2017 after running annually for several years. The city has also hosted the annual film and music festival Thin Line Fest annually since 2007. It is Texas's longest-running documentary film festival and attracts thousands of tourists over a few days each year.

Denton Square

The Denton Square, bordered by Oak, Hickory, Locust, and Elm Streets, is a cultural and political hub of the city. At its center is the Denton County Courthouse-on-the-Square, which includes local government offices and a museum showcasing area history and culture.

Listed on the U.S. National Register of Historic Places, the former county courthouse was restored for the Texas Sesquicentennial in 1986. The positive response to the renovation sparked a downtown revitalization program that generated new jobs and reinvestment capital. The downtown square is populated by local shops and restaurants, some of which have been in business since the 1940s. Each year, the downtown square is adorned with lights and spotlighted during the Denton Holiday Lighting Festival.

In 1918, the Daughters of the Confederacy erected the Denton Confederate Soldier Monument, a  granite, arched monument topped with a statue of a Confederate soldier, in the Denton Square on the courthouse lawn. The monument was controversial, and Denton County Commissioners unanimously approved its removal on June 9, 2020.

Government

Denton is the county seat of Denton County. From 1914 to 1959, the City of Denton used a mayor–city commission system, but a charter adopted in 1959 created a council–manager form of city government. Residents elect a mayor, four single-member district council members, and two at-large members. The Denton City Council appoints the city manager. Council terms are for two years, with a maximum of three consecutive terms, and elections are held each year in May. Denton Municipal Utilities administers utilities; the city provides water, wastewater, electric, drainage and solid waste service. The electric utility, Denton Municipal Electric (DME), has been in operation since 1905. In 2009, DME began providing 40% of its energy to customers through renewable resources. The City of Denton Water Utilities Department serves the city's water demand. Atmos Energy provides the city's natural gas. Denton is a part of the Sister Cities International program and maintains cultural and economic exchange programs with its sister cities, Madaba, Jordan, and San Nicolás de los Garza, Mexico.

Denton is a voluntary member of the North Central Texas Council of Governments association, the purpose of which is to coordinate individual and collective local governments and facilitate regional solutions, eliminate unnecessary duplication, and enable joint decisions.

Politics
Denton is historically a solidly Republican-voting city, but it has become more competitive in national elections as its population has diversified, shifting toward the Democratic Party in more recent elections.

Federal and state government
After the 2021 redistricting process, new and significantly different political boundaries were set for Denton County. Starting in 2023, most of Denton will be in the 13th Congressional district. The southwest portions of the city will be in the 26th Congressional district.

Almost all of the city is in newly drawn Texas House district 64. Some portions of south, north, and far east Denton are in Texas House districts 57 and 106. All of the city is in the new Texas Senate district 30, except for some western portions in district 12.

Several Texas state agencies have facilities in the city, including a Texas Workforce Center, a Texas Department of Public Safety office, a Texas Department of Criminal Justice office, and a Denton District Parole Office.

The Denton State Supported Living Center, formerly Denton State School, is Texas's largest residential facility for people with developmental disabilities. It serves an 18-county area and employs approximately 1,500 people.

The Federal Emergency Management Agency (FEMA) has its Region VI headquarters in Denton.

County and municipal government 
All Denton city council and mayoral terms are two years, unlike in most cities in the area, which use three-year terms. Even-numbered years bring the elections of the three at-large seats, places 5 & 6 and mayor. Odd-numbered years bring the elections of the four district council members.

The mayor is Gerard Hudspeth, who was elected in 2020 and reelected in 2022.

In 2014, city voters approved a ban on fracking.

In 2022, city voters approved decriminalization of possession of misdemeanor amounts of marijuana.

Education

Primary and secondary schools

Denton Independent School District (DISD) provides the public primary and secondary educational system in the majority of the city. The district comprises four comprehensive high schools (Braswell, Denton, Guyer, and Ryan), one alternative high school, and multiple elementary and middle schools. Small portions of the city extend into the Argyle, Krum, Ponder, and Sanger school districts. The respective comprehensive high schools of these districts are: Argyle, Krum, Ponder, and Sanger.

Denton is also host to several private schools with religious affiliations and alternative education models. According to the 2010 United States Census, 35.1% of all adults over the age of 25 in Denton have obtained a bachelor's degree, as compared to the state average of 25.8%, and 86.1% of residents over the age of 25 have earned a high school diploma, as compared to the state average of 80%.

The high school residential program Texas Academy of Mathematics and Science, for gifted students, is in Denton.

The Roman Catholic Immaculate Conception Catholic School, a K–8 school of the Roman Catholic Diocese of Fort Worth, opened in 1995. Construction on the current facility started on July 15, 2001, with its opening on August 19, 2002.

The charter school operator Life's Beautiful Educational Centers Inc. (closed 1999) operated the school L.O.V.E. in Denton.

Public libraries

Denton is served by the Denton Public Library, which has three branches: Emily Fowler Central Library, North Branch Library, and South Branch Library.

University of North Texas

The University of North Texas (UNT) in Denton is the flagship university of the University of North Texas System, which also includes the UNT Health Science Center in Fort Worth, the University of North Texas at Dallas, UNT Dallas College of Law, and a satellite campus in Frisco. With an enrollment of over 42,000, it's the fifth largest university in Texas. The university is accredited by the Southern Association of Colleges and Schools (SACS). Its College of Music, the first school to offer a degree in the field of jazz studies, is internationally recognized and known for producing successful artists.

Texas Woman's University

Texas Woman's University (TWU) is a public university system in Denton with two health science center campuses in Dallas and Houston. Founded in 1901, the university enrolls more than 13,000 undergraduates and graduates. Men have been admitted to TWU since 1972 but make up less than ten percent of the university. TWU's College of Nursing is the second largest in Texas and in the top 20 of largest nursing programs in the United States, and the school's nursing doctoral program is the largest in the world.

FSB Exchange at NCTC Denton

North Central Texas College (NCTC) is a public community college based in Gainesville, Texas. Starting in the 2019–2020 school year, North Central Texas College partnered with First State Bank to open a branch campus in downtown Denton. Located in the former Denton Record-Chronicle building, the campus focuses on accounting, business, biology, early childhood education, kinesiology, psychology, and general studies.

Media

Since 1899, the Denton Record-Chronicle has been the newspaper of record for Denton. When it was acquired by Belo Corporation in 1999, the newspaper had a circulation of 16,000. The North Texas Daily and The Lasso provide daily and weekly news to students at the University of North Texas and Texas Woman's University. The city's public television station, Denton TV (DTV), covers city council meetings, restaurant scores, high school football, and educational programming. UNT's television station, ntTV, is broadcast on local channels provided by Charter Communications and Verizon Communications. ntTV News is broadcast live Monday through Thursday. KNTU 88.1 FM is UNT's official radio station. First aired in 1969, the station primarily plays a mixture of jazz and blues and covers local sports and news.

Infrastructure

Health care 

Two major hospitals operate in Denton: Medical City Denton and Texas Health Presbyterian Hospital Denton are both full-service hospitals with differing capacities: 208 beds and 255 beds, respectively. Each employs more than 800 employees and are licensed with emergency services.

Fracking ban
In response to the previously mentioned, 2014 city referendum prohibiting hydraulic fracturing (fracking) that passed with 59% of the vote, Texas enacted a law specifying "the exclusive jurisdiction of this state to regulate oil and gas operations in this state and the express preemption of local regulation of those operations", though it allows some "commercially reasonable" rules. Denton's city council put out a statement affirming it will "continue to enforce our current regulations to protect the health and safety of our residents, but we do not know how the operators or courts will react".

Transportation

I-35E and I-35W, which split in Hillsboro south of the Metroplex and come north through Dallas and Fort Worth respectively, rejoin near the University of North Texas campus in the southwest part of Denton to form Interstate 35 as it continues north on its way to Oklahoma. Loop 288 partially encircles the city; it passes through the northern limits of the city by C. H. Collins Athletic Complex and the eastern side near Golden Triangle Mall. Highway 77 and 377 go through the historic town square and Highway 380 connects Denton to Frisco and McKinney in the east and Decatur in the west. This airport serves as home to various cargo and charter operators as well as two flight schools. A new terminal opened in 2008, but as of June 2008 no scheduled commuter service is in place.

Mass transit
Denton is served by the Denton County Transportation Authority (DCTA), which operates local bus service, on-demand GoZone service, and regional rail to Lewisville and Carrollton, with connections to Dallas' DART rail system. In 2011, Downtown Denton Transit Center and Medpark Station opened as commuter rail stations on DCTA's A-train, which now has five stations and connects to the Green Line of Dallas Area Rapid Transit's (DART) Green Line at Trinity Mills Station. The two transit companies, along with the Trinity Rail Express (TRE) of Fort Worth, offer regional passes to be used on any of the three systems. As of August, 2017 (no deadline announced), rides between the first two (DDTC and Medpark) and the last two (Hebron and Trinity Mills) are "fare-free," though any ride to or through the 3rd stop (Lewisville Lake) will require a paid pass. DCTA states this will relocate downtown parking needs to the underutilized space at Medpark station, and enhance mobility in Downtown Denton, including for students, as well as for residents of Hebron who connect to the DART system one stop away at Trinity Mills.

DCTA also operates the Connect local bus service within Denton, special university shuttles, and on-demand GoZone services in partnership with TransitTech provider Via Transportation. All Connect services (not the A-train) are free of charge for students at the University of North Texas who swipe their ID at the bus entrance. Special Programs for Aging Needs (SPAN), a non-profit organization, offers paratransit service for senior citizens and people with disabilities of all ages.

Notable people

Politicians and activists
 Amber Briggle, activist and business owner 
 Bob Castleberry, former mayor and sweepstakes winner (born in Denton)

Artists, entertainers, and celebrities
 Michael Lee Aday, also known as Meat Loaf, singer and actor
 Aaron Aryanpur, stand-up comedian (grew up in Denton)
 Shirley Cothran, 1975 Miss America (born in Denton County, Texas and Denton High graduate)
 Herschel Evans, jazz musician (born in Denton)
 Phyllis George, 1971 Miss America, First Lady of Kentucky (1979–1983); businesswoman, actress, and sportscaster
 Andrew Savage, painter, Grammy-nominated musician, co-frontman of Parquet Courts (born in Denton)
 Sarah Jaffe, American singer-songwriter
 Ralph Kirshbaum, classical cellist (born in Denton, raised in Tyler, Texas)
 Jason Lee, actor, skateboarder
 Xander Mobus, voice actor
 Ray Peterson, 1950s/1960s pop singer (born in Denton)
 Robert Ray "Rocky" Shahan, actor, stuntman (born and died in Denton)
 Ann Sheridan, actress (born in Denton)
 Sly Stone, Sly & The Family Stone founder (born in Denton)
 Mike Wiebe, musician (The Riverboat Gamblers), actor and stand-up comedian
 Tommy Taylor, American Musician (born in Denton)

Athletes
 Mario Bennett, former NBA player from 1995 to 2000 (born in Denton)
 Jim Chamblee, former MLB player (born in Denton)
 Carl Garrett, NFL player (born in Denton)

Abner Haynes, former NFL player (born in Denton)
 Austin Jackson, MLB player (born in Denton)
 Corey Knebel, MLB player (born in Denton)
 Jarvis Moss, NFL player (born in Denton)

Other
 Charles 'Tex' Watson, Manson Family murderer (born Farmersville, Texas; later moved to Denton)

Notes

References

Bibliography

 
 
 Mary Jo Cowling. Geography of Denton County. Dallas: Banks Upshaw and Co., 1936.
 
 E. Dale Odom and Bullitt Lowry. A Brief History of Denton County, Texas. Denton: Denton County Historical Commission, 1975.
 C. A. Bridges. History of Denton, Texas, from Its Beginning to 1960 (Waco: Texian Press, 1978)
  
  
  1989-

Further reading

External links

 
 City of Denton website
 

 
Cities in Texas
Cities in the Dallas–Fort Worth metroplex
Cities in Denton County, Texas
County seats in Texas
Populated places established in 1857
Butterfield Overland Mail in Texas
Articles containing video clips
1857 establishments in Texas